The Olympic Sports Center Gymnasium is an indoor arena next to the Olympic Sports Center Stadium at the southern part of the Olympic Green in Beijing, China.

It was reformed for the 2008 Summer Olympics where it hosted the handball tournaments up to and including the quarter-finals, after which they moved to the larger Beijing National Indoor Stadium. Following the handball competitions, the 2008 Beijing Wushu Tournament took place at the venue.

It has a seating capacity of 7,000 expanded from the original 6,000 and a floor space of 47,410 square meters from the current 43,000. Three handball training courts were put to use in 2008. The renovation was complete in August 2007.

References
Beijing2008.cn profile

Sports venues in Beijing
Venues of the 2008 Summer Olympics
Indoor arenas in China
Olympic handball venues
Venues of the 1990 Asian Games
Handball venues in China